Commission v Portugal (2010) C-171/08 is an EU law case, relevant for UK enterprise law, concerning European company law. Following a trend in cases such as Commission v United Kingdom, and Commission v Netherlands, it struck down public oversight, through golden shares of Portuguese telecommunications companies.

Facts
In January 2008, the European Commission referred Portugal to the European Court of Justice because it considered that the special rights conferred on the State by its golden shares in Portugal Telecom (PT) discouraged investment from other Member States in violation of the EC Treaty.

Judgment
The Grand Chamber of the Court of Justice of the European Union held that the Portuguese law violated free movement of capital.

See also

United Kingdom enterprise law

Notes

References

United Kingdom enterprise case law
Court of Justice of the European Union case law